Jonathan Castro Otto (born 3 March 1994), commonly known as Jonny, is a Spanish professional footballer who plays for Premier League club Wolverhampton Wanderers as a right or left-back.

He began his career with Celta, making his debut with the first team at the age of 18 and going on to appear in 221 matches in all competitions. In 2018 he signed with Wolverhampton Wanderers, initially on loan.

Jonny made his senior debut for Spain in 2018.

Club career

Celta
Born in Vigo, Galicia, Jonny played youth football with his hometown club RC Celta de Vigo. He spent his first season as a senior with the reserves in Segunda División B, featuring regularly but suffering relegation.

Jonny made his La Liga debut for the main squad on 1 September 2012, starting in a 2–0 home win against CA Osasuna. On 5 November, he renewed his contract with until 2017.

Jonny was definitively promoted to the first team at the start of 2013–14 after the arrival of Luis Enrique as coach, and appeared in 26 matches during that campaign. On 19 January 2015, he further extended his link until 2019.

Jonny scored his first professional goal on 20 February 2016, the second in a 3–2 home victory over SD Eibar. He finished the season with 36 league appearances, helping the side finish sixth and qualify to the UEFA Europa League.

On 18 January 2017, Jonny scored the 2–1 winner away against Real Madrid in the quarter-finals of the Copa del Rey (eventual 4–3 aggregate triumph).

Wolverhampton Wanderers
On 25 July 2018, Jonny joined Atlético Madrid for an undisclosed fee, signing a six-year contract but moving immediately to English club Wolverhampton Wanderers on a season-long loan. His maiden appearance in the Premier League took place on 11 August, when he played the entire 2–2 home draw against Everton.

Jonny scored his first league goal on 29 September 2018, in a 2–0 home win over Southampton. On 18 November, he suffered a knee ligament injury while playing for Spain, being initially sidelined until the end of the year but recovering a few weeks later.

Having been a regular first-team player during the first half of the campaign, Jonny agreed to a permanent four-and-a-half-year deal at Molineux on 31 January 2019 for an undisclosed fee, reported to be £15 million. In August 2020, during a Europa League tie against Olympiacos FC, he suffered an anterior cruciate ligament injury that sidelined him for six months.

Jonny returned to action on 7 February 2021, playing the first half of the 0–0 league draw against Leicester City. He signed a new contract shortly after, until 2025.

On 4 April 2021, Jonny suffered another serious anterior cruciate ligament injury to the same knee while training for the upcoming fixture against West Ham United, which ruled him out for the rest of that season and the bulk of the following one. He made his return on 24 February 2022, as a second-half substitute in a Premier League game at Arsenal.

Jonny marked his 100th competitive appearance for Wolves on 18 March 2022 by scoring the first goal in the 3–2 home loss to Leeds United, his first goal since July 2020. He repeated the feat in the subsequent match, a 2–1 home defeat of local rivals Aston Villa.

International career
After playing for Spain at under-18, under-19, under-20 and under-21 levels, Jonny was called up to the full side on 26 May 2015, for a friendly with Costa Rica and a UEFA Euro 2016 qualifier against Belarus. He did not take part in any of those matches, however.

Jonny won his first cap for his country on 11 October 2018, contributing to a 4–1 friendly defeat of Wales at the Millennium Stadium after replacing César Azpilicueta in the 63rd minute.

Career statistics

Club

International

Honours
Spain U19
UEFA European Under-19 Championship: 2012

Spain U21
UEFA European Under-21 Championship runner-up: 2017

References

External links

Wolverhampton Wanderers official profile

1994 births
Living people
Spanish footballers
Footballers from Vigo
Association football defenders
La Liga players
Segunda División B players
Celta de Vigo B players
RC Celta de Vigo players
Atlético Madrid footballers
Premier League players
Wolverhampton Wanderers F.C. players
Spain youth international footballers
Spain under-21 international footballers
Spain international footballers
Spanish expatriate footballers
Expatriate footballers in England
Spanish expatriate sportspeople in England